Guangzhou Zhixin High School, located in the southern Chinese city of Guangzhou (Canton), was founded in 1921 by Sun Yat-sen in memory of his comrade, the democratic fighter Zhu Zhixin, who was killed in action in a battle at Humen, Dongguan, at the age of 35. In the school campus, a symbolic tomb was built for Zhu. In 1936, the remains of Zhu were relocated to the campus because of a termite problem at the original site. Since its establishment, the school has been one of the most prestigious high schools in the country and had seen the graduation of many outstanding alumni over the years. Many famous visitors have come to campus.  In the early twentieth century, Zhixin High School became one of the 37 key high schools in China. In 1994, it was graded as a First Level School of Guangdong Province. It is currently evaluated as a National Level Demonstrative School.

History
1921-1927, Zhixin Private School
1928, renamed to Zhixin Girls Private High School
1943, renamed to Zhixin Girls Public High School
1953, renamed to No. 1 Girls High School of Guangzhou
1969, renamed No. 55 High School of Guangzhou
During the Cultural Revolution, Zhixin was renamed to "Red Girls School"
1978–present, Guangzhou Zhixin High School

Early Board Members
Jin Zeng Cheng, Wang Jingwei, Hu Hanmin, Lin Sen, Liao Zhongkai, Wu Chaoxu, Xu Chongqing, Zou Lu, Chen Bijun, Li Shizeng, Wu Zhihui, Sun Ke, Deng Zeru, Gu Yingfun, Lin Yunhai, Hu Qingrui, Chen Lianbo, Chen Yaozhu, Chen Rong, Guo Biao, Dai Chuanxian, Li Dazhao, Zhang Ji, Huo Zhiting, Zeng Xing, Tan Yankai, He Xiangning, Chen Gongbo, Zeng Zhongming, Ma Honghuan, Liu Jiwen, and Chu Minyi.

Founding speech by Sun Yat-sen
October 1, 1921, Mr. Sun Yat-sen and his wife Soong Ching-ling gave the following speech at the founding ceremony of the Zhixin Private School.

"As a revolutionary pioneer and writer, Mr. Zhu Zhixin made a great contribution to the Republic of China by influencing his comrades and people with perseverance. In each and every battle for the Republic, Mr. Zhu always marched in the frontline, braving tremendous difficulty and danger. In literature, Mr. Zhu wrote masterpieces that impressed his peers and influenced the literary culture of the country. Both a theorist and a practitioner in the subject of revolution, Mr. Zhu led the life of a brightly shining star. Last year, Mr. Zhu made the ultimate sacrifice for his country in the battle of Canton. Today, we stand here together to celebrate his life by establishing the Zhixin Private School. I hope that our future generations will follow the glorious path blazed by our pioneer, study with perseverance and diligence, reform the future society and build a magnificent Republic of China."

Former Principals
These men and women have served as principals since the founding:
Xing Zeng  1921-1927 
Daoyi Yang 1927-1940.9 
Cengcheng Jin 1940.9-1943.7 
Baoquan Lin 1943.7-1949.10 
Qinyu Kong 1950.1-1958.4 
Yi Zhang 1958.5-1964.7 
Ke Zhang 1964.8-1967.6 
Ke Zhang 1967.7-1970.4 
Guangguo Gui 1970.5-1971.10 
Zhisheng Wang 1971.11-1974.4 
Binquan Wang 1974.4-1974.9 
Kentang Yu 1974.9-1976.7 
Zhaoman Yao 1976.8-1978.9 
Kentang Yu 1978.10-1980.3 
Guoxian Zhou 1980.4-1983.8 
Shixiong Ye 1983.9-1984.9 
Shixiong Ye 1984.10-1988.3 
Lijun Xin 1988.4-1990.7 
Zhixin Chen 1990.8-1999.7 
Jianqiang Zhu 1999.7-2003.2 
Shisen Liu 2003.2-2008.7 
Yong He 2008.7-

References

External links
 Zhixin High School
 Zhixin Alumni Network - www.zhixin.org : Connecting Zhixin alumni in China and abroad ...
 
 Zhixin High School - Facebook page

High schools in Guangdong
Educational institutions established in 1921
Yuexiu District
1921 establishments in China